Richard Sommer may refer to:
 Richard Sommer (winemaker), American winemaker
 Richard M. Sommer, American architect, urbanist, and scholar
 Rich Sommer, American actor